The Maryland House of Delegates is the lower house of the legislature of the State of Maryland.  It consists of 141 delegates elected from 47 districts.  The House of Delegates Chamber is in the Maryland State House on State Circle in Annapolis, the state capital.  The State House also houses the Maryland State Senate Chamber and the offices of the Governor and Lieutenant Governor of the State of Maryland.  Each delegate has offices in Annapolis, in the nearby Casper R. Taylor Jr. House Office Building.

History of Maryland House of Delegates

17th century origins 
The Maryland House of Delegates originated as the Lower House of the General Assembly of the Province of Maryland in 1650, during the time when it was an English colony, when the Assembly (legislature) became a bicameral body.  The Lower House often fought with the Upper House for political influence in the colony.  The Upper House consisted of the Governor and his Council, all personally appointed by Lord Baltimore and Proprietor of the Province, and thus tended to protect his interests in Maryland.  Conversely, the Lower House tended to push for political change in the colony, claiming to be the true elected representatives of the people.

In this context, the Lower House continually fought for more power by asserting exclusive rights in certain legislative areas, such as levying taxes and originating money bills. This reflected similar attitudes in the other colonies on the East Coast of North America with the beginnings and growth of representative government during the 17th century, as each province's representatives constantly agitated for more rights, powers, and respect from the Proprietors, Governors, and even the King and Parliament in London.

The Governor also had some measure of control over the Lower House in the late seventeenth century.  Despite the fact that each county was entitled to elect four delegates, the governor selected only two of these to sit in the Lower House. This enabled the Governor to control the Lower House's membership.

In 1689, the transfer of Maryland from a proprietary colony to a royal colony temporarily quieted the disputes between the Lower House and the Governor and Council.  Appointed by the crown, the royal governors allowed the Lower House substantial latitude with its legislative agenda. The first General Assembly under Royal Authority, in 1692, passed 85 acts in a single session. The Lower House immediately acted to remove the Governor's influence over the election of delegates. Now, elected delegates could attend the session without the need for a special writ from the Governor. At the same time, standing or continuing committees were established. These eliminated the Lower House's reliance on ad hoc committees and created the first modern legislature in Maryland. During this period, the Lower House became known as the "House of Delegates".

18th century
The Maryland Constitution of 1776 formally established the modern House of Delegates. Initially, representation was based on geography as the voters of each county elected four delegates, and two each were elected from the towns of Annapolis and Baltimore.  These delegates served one-year terms (increased to two years in 1845, and four years in 1922, as it is today).

19th century
Beginning with the 1838 elections, each county elected at least three and up to six delegates depending on its population.  Baltimore City elected the same number of delegates as did the most populous county, but after 1840, the Town of Annapolis was then considered part of Anne Arundel County. Reapportionment was required after every federal census in an attempt to achieve equal representation.

Modern era
The current pattern for distribution of seats in the House of Delegates began with the legislative apportionment plan of 1972 and has been revised every ten years thereafter. The plan created 47 legislative districts, many of which cross county boundaries to delineate districts relatively equal in population. Each legislative district sends three delegates for a total of 141 members of the House. Some of the larger districts are divided into delegate sub-districts to provide local representation to areas not large enough to constitute an entire legislative district. In a special session on May 1, 2019, Delegate Adrienne Jones became the first woman and the first African American to be elected Speaker of the Maryland House of Delegates.

Powers and functions
The powers and functions of the Maryland House of Delegates are outlined in the Maryland Constitution. Along with the State Senate, the House has the power to approve laws, establish executive departments, levy taxes, and propose state constitutional amendments. Both houses also have the power to elect the state treasurer and to appoint a new Governor if the offices of Governor and Lieutenant Governor are simultaneously vacant. In addition, the House of Delegates has the sole power to impeach members of the executive branch, including the Governor. Once the House of Delegates has passed articles of impeachment, the person impeached stands trial before the State Senate.

Organization
The House of Delegates utilizes a number of different organizational structures. Much of the work of drafting and reviewing bills is done by six standing committees: Appropriations, Economic Matters, Environment and Transportation, Health and Government Operations, Judiciary, and Ways and Means. Each of these committees is then divided further into sub-committees by issue area. An additional continuing committee, Executive Nominations, has the responsibility for confirming appointments of the Governor. Delegates also divide themselves into a variety of legally recognized work groups, Joint and Special Committees, caucuses, and geographic delegations. The two largest caucuses are those of the Democratic and Republican Parties.

Smaller caucuses might group Delegates by identity, such as the Women's Caucus, notably the first women's legislative caucus founded in the United States. The Asian-American and Pacific Islander caucus, or Legislative Black Caucus are other examples. Delegates may also organize by issue or area of experience, such as the Veterans' Caucus. In addition, delegates from a certain county, smaller towns, or Baltimore City might organize its delegate delegation into a caucus-style group, such as the Baltimore City Delegation or the Western Maryland Delegation.

Composition

Leadership
Current leadership in the Maryland House of Delegates.

List of current delegates

Committees

See also
 List of Districts in the Maryland House of Delegates
 Government of Maryland

References

Further reading 
Legislative District Maps, which are updated every ten years

 As of February 24, 2012
 As of June 21, 2002
 As of 1992

External links
 Maryland General Assembly
 Archives of Maryland Historical List, House of Delegates (1790-1990)

Maryland General Assembly
State lower houses in the United States
1650 establishments in Maryland
Maryland Democratic-Republicans